Pomella is a genus of freshwater snails, aquatic gastropod mollusks in the family Ampullariidae, the apple snails.

As is the case in some other genera of apple snails, Pomella deposits eggs above the waterline in calcareous clutches. This protects the eggs against predation by fish and other aquatic inhabitants.

Species
Species within the genus Pomella include:
 Pomella americanista (Ihering, 1919)
 Pomella megastoma (G. B. Sowerby I, 1825)

Uruguay
The name of the Uruguay river, which gave its name to the country, comes from the Spanish settlers' rendering of the native name the inhabitants of the region used to designate it. This interpretation is considered possible because uruguás are abundant in the river

References 

Ampullariidae